Petersburg is a neighborhood of Louisville, Kentucky centered along Petersburg Road and Indian Trail.

Neighborhoods in Louisville, Kentucky